Helle Bjerregaard  (born 21 June 1968) is a Danish football goalkeeper who played for the Denmark women's national football team at the 1996 Summer Olympics, but did not play.

See also
 Denmark at the 1996 Summer Olympics

References

External links
 

1968 births
Living people
Danish women's footballers
Place of birth missing (living people)
Footballers at the 1996 Summer Olympics
Olympic footballers of Denmark
Women's association football goalkeepers
1995 FIFA Women's World Cup players
1991 FIFA Women's World Cup players
Denmark women's international footballers